Iskandar Malaysia, formerly known as Iskandar Development Region (IDR) and South Johor Economic Region (SJER), is the main southern development corridor in Johor, Malaysia. It was established on 8 November 2006. Iskandar Malaysia, which is formed by major cities such as Johor Bahru, Iskandar Puteri, Pasir Gudang, together with their surrounding areas, is Malaysia's second largest urban agglomeration with a population of 2,500,000, after Greater Kuala Lumpur.

Iskandar Malaysia's development is guided by the Comprehensive Development Plan (CDP) and the Circle of Sustainability, ensuring that the region grows holistically into a prosperous economy with a high-quality living ecosystem and a resilient environment.

Iskandar Malaysia's generous land area, strategic location and abundant ready infrastructure boosted its 9 promoted sectors which are Electrical & Electronics, Petrochemical and Oleo-Chemical, Food & Agro-Processing, Logistics, Tourism, Creative, Healthcare and Financial.

With a target of 3 million population and RM383 billion in cumulative investment by 2025, the thriving economic environment is complemented by the growth in the social and environmental facets.

Environmentally, the development of Iskandar Malaysia is through a Green-focused Agenda, whereby a green and sustainable environment is one of the main agenda. ‘Iskandar Malaysia Low Carbon Society Blueprint’ is acknowledged locally and globally and has driven many stakeholders in the region to adopt various green programmes and initiatives that benefit the businesses and community.

Iskandar Malaysia is also developed to be a Smart City which encompasses the 6 dimensions of Smart Economy, Smart Governance, Smart Environment, Smart Mobility, Smart People and Smart Living and, is proud of its achievement in the creation of this pilot program for Smart cities across Malaysia and the region.

The development of Iskandar Malaysia is planned, promoted and facilitated by Iskandar Regional Development Authority.

History
The special economic zone of Iskandar Malaysia grew out of a 2005 government requested feasibility study by the Khazanah Nasional which found that the development of such a zone would be economically, socially and developmentally beneficial. The National SJER Planning Committee (NSPC), hearing Khazanah's findings, put it in charge of developing a sustainable, holistic approach to development in the region. Iskandar Malaysia was singled out as among the high-impact developments of the Ninth Malaysia Plan, put into action by the then Prime Minister of Malaysia (Abdullah Badawi) in March 2006 to cover the period of 2006 to 2010. In November 2006, the Prime Minister, Chief Minister of Johor, Abdul Ghani Othman and Khazanah revealed the Comprehensive Development Plan (CDP).

Area

The development region encompasses an area of 4,749 km2 covering Johor Bahru District, Kulai District and part of Pontian District. 5 local government authorities have jurisdiction over the covered area, including Johor Bahru City Council, Iskandar Puteri City Council, Pasir Gudang City Council, Kulai Municipal Council, Pontian Municipal Council.

The population of Iskandar Malaysia is slightly over 2 million in 2020.

Comprehensive Development Plan

Physical Development Plan
The Physical Development Plan (PDP) was designed to guide the development of land within Iskandar Malaysia to help promote the CDP's overall goals of economic development and quality of life. To that end, the CDP includes two major subdivisions among land zones, "Basic Zoning Districts" and "Special Overlay Zones".

There are several dozen primary "Basic Zoning Districts" governing the use of land in commercial, residential, industrial and other sectors, including determining the density of development and what mixed-use may or may not be allowed. Also governed by the "Basic Zoning Districts" are such special use zones as green space, wetlands, cemeteries and governmental developments.

"Special Overlay Zones" are areas that require exceptional treatment. For example, the "Johor Bahru CBD" allows exceptions to general commercial plot ratio and height because the zone is the commercial and financial centre of Iskandar Malaysia and the capital city of Johor. Similarly, the "Iskandar Puteri Central Planning Area" is given special handling. Other "Special Overlay Zones" cover environmentally sensitive areas, historic areas, coastland, development around highways and rail stations and the "Water Catchment Zone" around the Sultan Iskandar Dam.

Commercial development
The commercial focus of the CDP is on six services identified as "pillars", including creative, educational, financial, healthcare, logistics and tourism. The CDP included the establishment of the Iskandar Investment Berhad, a commercial investment holding company created to oversee and encourage regional development. The CDP promotes the "Strategic Catalyst Development" goals of developing waterfront areas, promoting tourism, expanding healthcare and iconic areas, and mixing commercial and residential development.

It also incorporates a "Business Incentives and Support Package" (ISP) discussed by Prime Minister Badawi on 22 March 2007 which allows special incentives to encourage investment in certain concentrated hubs in the flagship zones. The specific zones involved were revealed in October 2007 and at that time included only Medini Iskandar Malaysia, which is a mixed-development zone incorporating leisure, residential, financial and high-end industrial components. Incentives include tax exemptions for qualifying companies for income from qualifying activities, exemption from Foreign Investment Committee rules, and flexibilities under the foreign exchange administration rules, including those restricting the numbers of "foreign knowledge workers".

Doubling sizes
On 22 February 2019, Iskandar Malaysia growth corridor doubled in size and will include at least two new districts which is Kluang and Kota Tinggi. The region was 2,217 sq/km previously and will cover an area of 4,749 sq/km, which includes parts of Kota Tinggi, Kluang and Pontian.

Major projects 2006-2025 
 Iskandar Coastal Highway
 Johor Bahru East Coast Highway
 Johor Bahru Eastern Dispersal Link Expressway
 Johor Premium Outlets
 Kota Iskandar
 Larkin Sentral
 Legoland Malaysia Resort
 Senai–Desaru Expressway
 Asia Petroleum Hub
 Tanjung Bin Power Plant
 Southern Gateway CIQ
 Iskandar Puteri HSR
 Johor Bahru–Singapore Rapid Transit System
 RAPID Pengerang Refinery
 Forest City
 Princess Cove
 Ibrahim International Business District IIBD
 Desaru Coast
 Puteri Harbour
 Iskandar Sentral
 Southkey Mall
 Gerbang Nusajaya
 Educity
 Sunway Iskandar
 Iskandar Malaysia Bus Rapid Transit
 Pontian bridge

Transportation

Air

The region is served by Senai International Airport which is located in Senai. Six airlines, AirAsia, Firefly, Malaysia Airlines, Malindo Air, Jin Air and Xpress Air, provide flights internationally and domestically.

Train

The region consists of Johor Bahru Sentral, Kempas Baru and Kulai Station.

Sea

For cargo ports, the region consists of Johor Port in Pasir Gudang and Port of Tanjung Pelepas in Iskandar Puteri.

For passenger service boats, the region consists of Johor Bahru International Ferry Terminal in Stulang, Johor Bahru, Kukup International Ferry Terminal in Kukup, Pontian District, Pasir Gudang Ferry Terminal in Pasir Gudang and Puteri Harbour International Ferry Terminal in Kota Iskandar, Iskandar Puteri.

Road

Iskandar Puteri houses Gelang Patah, GP Sentral, Kota Iskandar, Taman U, Taman Ungku Tun Aminah terminals. Johor Bahru houses JB Sentral, Larkin Sentral, Taman Johor Jaya and Ulu Tiram terminals. Kulai houses Kulai terminal. Pasir Gudang houses Masai and Pasir Gudang terminal. Pontian houses Pontian Public Transportation terminal. Grab operates in the city.

The internal roads linking different parts of the region are mostly federal roads constructed and maintained by Malaysian Public Works Department. The five major highways linking the Johor Bahru Central Business District to outlying suburbs are Tebrau Highway and Johor Bahru Eastern Dispersal Link Expressway in the northeast, Skudai Highway in the northwest, Iskandar Coastal Highway in the west and Johor Bahru East Coast Highway in the east. Pasir Gudang Highway and the connecting Johor Bahru Parkway cross Tebrau Highway and Skudai Highway, which serve as the middle ring road of the metropolitan area. The Johor Bahru Inner Ring Road aids in controlling the traffic around the city center of Johor Bahru. Access to the national expressway is provided through the North–South Expressway and Senai–Desaru Expressway. The Johor–Singapore Causeway links the city to Woodlands, Singapore with a six-lane road and a railway line terminating at the Southern Integrated Gateway. The Malaysia–Singapore Second Link, located west of the metropolitan area, was constructed in 1997 to alleviate congestion on the Causeway. It is linked directly to the Second Link Expressway, Johor Bahru Parkway, the railway station, and the North–South Expressway. Further expansion of other major highways in the city were currently in the process.

See also
 Malaysian National Projects
 Iskandar Puteri
 Kota Iskandar
 Cahaya Jauhar
 Economy of Malaysia
 East Coast Economic Region
 Johor Bahru
 Ninth Malaysia Plan
 Sabah Development Corridor
 Sarawak Corridor of Renewable Energy

References

Geography of Johor

Development Corridors in Malaysia
2006 establishments in Malaysia
Metropolitan areas of Malaysia